Second Baptist Church of Dover is a historic Baptist church in Dover Plains in Dutchess County, New York.  It was originally conceived and erected in the 1830s.  It is a heavy timber-frame structure on a foundation formed of dressed ashlar marble.  Renovations occurred in 1868 and 1887.  It has a gable roof and features a three-stage bell tower with steeple and crowning weather vane.

It was added to the National Register of Historic Places in 2010.

See also
National Register of Historic Places listings in Dutchess County, New York

References

Baptist churches in New York (state)
Churches on the National Register of Historic Places in New York (state)
Churches in Dutchess County, New York
National Register of Historic Places in Dutchess County, New York
Religious organizations established in the 1830s
1830s establishments in New York (state)